The 2018 Qatar motorcycle Grand Prix was the first round of the 2018 MotoGP season. It was held at the Losail International Circuit in Doha on 18 March 2018.

Classification

MotoGP

Moto2

Moto3

 Albert Arenas suffered a broken right collarbone in a crash during Sunday warm-up and withdrew from the event.
 Tatsuki Suzuki suffered a broken right forearm in a crash during Friday practice and withdrew from the event.

Championship standings after the race

MotoGP

Moto2

Moto3

References

Qatar
Motorcycle Grand Prix
Qatar motorcycle Grand Prix
Qatar